Türkiye is the Turkish name for Turkey, or officially the Republic of Türkiye, a country in Asia and 
Europe.

On May 26, 2022, the Turkish Minister of Foreign Affairs submitted a request to the United Nations (UN) to change the official name of Turkey to the Republic of Türkiye.

Türkiye, Turkiye, or variations may also refer to:

 Türkiye (newspaper), a Turkish newspaper
 Türkiye.gov.tr, a Turkish public services website; see 
 SS LASH Türkiye, former name of the

See also

 
 
 Turkish (disambiguation)
 Turkic (disambiguation)
 Turkey (disambiguation)
 Turke (disambiguation)
 Turki (disambiguation)
 Turky (disambiguation)
 Turk (disambiguation)